The West Adelaide Football Club (1878–1887), previously known as the West Torrens Football Club, was an Australian rules football club that participated in the South Australian Football Association during the 1887 SAFA season.

West Torrens Football Club submitted an application to the join the SAFA but at the Association's Annual General Meeting held on 1 April 1879 the club's application was rejected by 12 votes to 19 against as a number of delegates felt there was already too many weak teams in the Association.

The club's first annual dinner took place with about 50 members present at the Foresters' and Squatters' Arms, Thebarton, on Thursday evening. October 14, 1879. Mr. J. Beesley was captain and secretary and he reported eight matches had been played with the following result: Won, three; drawn, three; lost, two. Four of the matches were with SAFA first twenties, and of these one was won, one was drawn, and two were lost.

Annual General Meeting of the West Torrens club was held on April 7, 1881, at Squatters Arms, Thebarton.

On 15 March 1887 the West Torrens Football Club held a meeting at the Foundry Hotel, Hindley Street in Adelaide where it decided to change the name of the club to West Adelaide and apply for inclusion in the upcoming 1887 SAFA season.
The following office bearers were elected: Patron, Mr. C. C. Kingston; president, Mr. A. A. Fox; vice-presidents, several; and secretary and treasurer, Mr, A. Monck.

The club was nicknamed “The Butchers” because some of the team's players were slaughtermen and the club played matches near the West Park slaughterhouse situated behind the Adelaide Gaol.

Team colours for the SAFA 1887 season were red, white and blue. Initially the team wore red and in 1881 red and white.

Summary of their only SAFA season - Finished in last place. Played 16 Won 1 Drew 2  Lost 13  (Win and Draw against Gawler and Draw against Hotham). Goals scored 18 - Behinds 52. 114 Goals and 288 behinds against. Top Goal kicker - Welsby 6 goals.

References 

Former South Australian National Football League clubs
1878 establishments in Australia
1887 disestablishments in Australia